Young Dynamite is a 1937 American crime film directed by Leslie Goodwins from a screenplay by Joseph O'Donnell and Stanley Roberts, adaptation by Arthur G. Durlam.  The film stars Frankie Darro, Kane Richmond, and Charlotte Henry.

Cast list
Frankie Darro as Freddie Shields
Kane Richmond as Tom Marlin
Charlotte Henry as Jane Shields
William Castello as Flash Slavin
David Sharpe as John Shields
Carleton Young as Spike
Pat Gleason as Butch Barker
Frank Austin as Doc Clark/Endeberry
Frank Sarasino as Tony Rankin

References

1937 films
1937 crime films
American crime films
American black-and-white films
Films directed by Leslie Goodwins
1930s American films